Ukraine competed at the 2007 Winter Universiade in Turin, Italy. 91 Ukrainian athletes competed in 10 sports out of 12 except for  curling and ice hockey. Ukraine won 16 medals, two of which was gold, ranked 11th by number of gold medals and shared with Italy 3rd rank by overall number of medals (after Russia and South Korea).

Medallists

Figure skating

See also
 Ukraine at the 2007 Summer Universiade

References

Sources
 Archive of the official web site
 Apline Skiing results
 Figure Skating results
 Nordic Combined results
 Ski Jumping results
 Results in speed skating
 Results in short track speed skating
 Snowboarding results

Ukraine at the Winter Universiade
Winter Universiade
2007 Winter Universiade